John Albert Whittaker (28 March 1950 – 29 September 2020) was a New Zealand rugby league footballer who played in the 1970s and 1980s at international level for the New Zealand national rugby league team and the Cook Islands.

Playing career
From the Randwick club, Whittaker also played for Wellington a record 73 times. Whittaker was involved in Randwick's premierships in 1968, 1969, 1970, 1976 and 1983.

Representative career
Whittaker made his international début for the New Zealand national rugby league team in 1970 and went on to play for the Kiwis in twenty four matches, including four world cups. Whittaker's international career spanned thirteen seasons. Despite suffering major injuries in a motoring accident, Whittaker made a full recovery and was recalled in the early 1980s after two years out of the national side.

Whittaker then represented the Cook Islands in the 1986 Pacific Cup.

Notable tour matches
John Whittaker played as an interchange/substitute in Warrington's 15-12 victory over Australia at Wilderspool Stadium, Warrington on Wednesday 11 October 1978.

Legacy
In 2012 Whittaker was named as one of the New Zealand Rugby League's Legends of League. At the Wellington Rugby League's Centenary celebrations, Whittaker was named as their player of the century. He was also named in their team of the century.

Whittaker died on 29 September 2020, aged 70.

References

External links
Statistics at wolvesplayers.thisiswarrington.co.uk

1950 births
2020 deaths
Central Districts rugby league team players
Cook Islands national rugby league team players
Deaths from cancer in New Zealand
New Zealand national rugby league team players
New Zealand rugby league players
Randwick Kingfishers players
Rugby league centres
Rugby league fullbacks
Rugby league wingers
Warrington Wolves players
Wellington rugby league team players